Prima Curia also called "first assembly of God church" is a practical church and spiritual organization based on ancient teachings of Jesus Christ. Prima Curia is from Latin meaning "first assembly".

Belief
Followers of Prima Curia believe in spiritual healing and prayer with purpose of a better life on earth. Beside the meditation, they do have a leader that lead them to learning more about God. Teachings are given in meetings to anybody who attend the church. The use of anointed items, such as water, salt, natural plants, herbs and very often spices is also frequent.

Church today
Prima Curia has spirituality group meeting and tries to reach more spiritual seekers as possible. This church is not affiliated with any other religious groups.

Leader

The leader of the church claimed Prima Curia to basically be a modern Christian church inspired by God himself.

References

Christian mysticism
Christian organizations